Beginning with the correspondence between Walter Benjamin and Gershom Scholem (or possibly before that, when Martin Buber became one of Franz Kafka's first publishers) interpretations, speculations, and reactions to Kafka's Judaism became so substantial during the 20th century as to virtually constitute an entire minor literature.  Meditations about how and to what extent Kafka anticipated or represented the incoming Holocaust of the European Jewry comprise a major component of most scholarship along these lines.

Kafka and Jewish mysticism

Shortly after he began to write The Castle (which he never finished), Kafka wrote in his diary that he had "suffered something very like a breakdown." Near the end of the entry he wrote:

"All such writing is an assault on all frontiers...it might easily have developed into a new secret doctrine, a Kabbalah. There are intimations of this. Though of course it would require genius of an unimaginable kind to strike root again in old centuries, or create the old centuries anew and not spend itself withal, but only then begin to flower forth."

Though his diaries were not published until 1948, there was a small but intense vortex of discussion about Kafka as a kind of 'secular Jewish mystic.' Kafka became the object of inquiry and discussion in a correspondence between two German-Jewish intellectuals who are themselves often considered 20th century mystics: Walter Benjamin and Gershom Scholem.

In 1937, Scholem who is generally acknowledged to be the founder of modern, academic study of the Kabbalah, wrote about Kafka in a letter to Salman Schocken. Scholem claimed that when he read the Czech author alongside the Pentateuch and the Talmud during a period of intensive study and feelings of 'the most rationalistic skepticism' about his area of study, "I [found in Kafka] the most perfect and unsurpassed expression of this fine line [between religion and nihilism] an expression which, as a secular statement of the Kabbalistic world-feeling in a modern spirit, seemed to me to wrap Kafka's writings in the halo of the canonical."

Scholem sent this letter to Schocken from Berlin to Jerusalem—where Scholem was shortly to follow after his publisher, as Nazi aggression in his homeland continued to ramp up before the advent of World War II. In the following year, between the Anschluss and the crossing of the Vistula on June 12 of 1938, Benjamin wrote to Scholem from Europe:

The long and the short of it is that apparently an appeal had to be made to the forces of this [ancient, naive mystical] tradition if an individual (by the name of Franz Kafka) was to be confronted with that reality of ours which realizes itself theoretically, for example, in modern (quantum and relativistic) physics, and practically in the technology of modem warfare. What I mean to say is that this reality can virtually no longer be experienced by an individual, and that Kafka's world, frequently of such playfulness and interlaced with angels, is the exact complement of his era which is preparing to do away with the inhabitants of this planet on a considerable scale. The experience which corresponds to that of Kafka, the private individual, will probably not become accessible to the masses until such time as they are being done away with.

Gershom Scholem was not alone among thinking people when he later read these lines as having some prophetic significance in respect to the onrushing disaster which befell the Jews in the European Holocaust.

Kafka and the Holocaust

George Steiner writes in his introduction to The Trial:

"Kafka's In the Penal Colony, his play on 'vermin' and annihilation in The Metamorphosis were actualized shortly after his death. A concrete fulfillment of augury, of detailed clairvoyance, attaches to his seeming fantastications.... Kafka's Milena and his three sisters died in the camps. The central European Jewish world which Kafka ironized and celebrated went to hideous extinction. The spiritual possibility exists that Franz Kafka experienced his prophetic powers as some visitation of guilt."

Steiner goes on to claim that Kafka's tortured struggle with the German language derives from hearing in its cadences the oncoming violence which was about to overwhelm and destroy the German-Jewish milieu in which Kafka had grown up:

German is the language which formulated Jew-hating obscenities and a will to annihilation without precedent. It unleashed from within itself the bellowing of the inhuman while, at the same time, laying claim to its eminent philosophic literary heritage and while continuing at many levels and in the domesticities of the every day, to function normally. The... dilemma has its premonitory antecedent in Kafka's torment over a 'false mother tongue'.

This latter suspicion seems to be well-founded based on a variety of passages from Kafka's diaries and letters. He wrote in his diary, "Yesterday it occurred to me that I did not always love my mother as she deserved and as I could, only because the German language prevented it." And, in his notorious diagnosis of the struggle of the German-Jewish writer, he wrote to Max Brod, "[The Jewish writers] live beset by three impossibilities: the impossibility of not writing, the impossibility of writing in German and the impossibility of writing differently, and we could add a fourth impossibility: the impossibility of writing at all."

Bibliography
"Franz Kafka" from Illuminations by Walter Benjamin
"Notes on Kafka" from Prisms by Theodor Adorno
Writing of the Disaster by Maurice Blanchot.
"Guilt and Guilt Feelings" by Martin Buber.
The Correspondence of Walter Benjamin, 1910–1940, by Walter Benjamin, Gershom Scholem, and Theodor Adorno
"Franz Kafka: The Jewish Patient" by Sander Gilman.
Burnt Books by Rodger Kamenetz
"Ten Unhistorical Aphorisms" by Gershom Scholem.

References

Judaism
Jewish literature
Holocaust literature
Secular Jewish culture in Europe